WWE 205 Live is an American professional wrestling streaming television program that was produced by WWE. It premiered on November 29, 2016 as a replacement for WWE Superstars, and ended on February 11, 2022. The show originally aired exclusively on the WWE Network until March 2021 when the American version of the WWE Network merged under Peacock, after which, it was available on Peacock in the United States and the WWE Network in international markets.

The show was originally centered around cruiserweights, male competitors billed at a maximum weight of 205 lbs. from the namesake 205 Live brand. With some exceptions, the show originally aired live (as its name implied) at 10pm Eastern Time following WWE's primary television program, SmackDown, and was broadcast from the same venue. By 2020, 205 Live episodes were pre-taped on the Tuesday before its airing.

In October 2019, 205 Live was integrated with the NXT brand with cruiserweights from both NXT and NXT UK appearing on the show. By August 2021, the show included female competitors as well as male competitors above the weight limit.

The final episode of the series aired on February 11, 2022. On February 18, it was replaced by NXT Level Up.

History

2016–2018
205 Live was established following the success of the Cruiserweight Classic tournament, to feature those who competed in the tournament and others who have become full-time members of WWE's cruiserweight division. Triple H, WWE executive producer and wrestler, stated the program was designed to serve as a showcase for the division, with its own distinctive feel and style compared to other WWE programming.

The Raw brand was originally established as the exclusive home of the division during the 2016 brand extension, with all cruiserweights being drafted to Raw during the 2016 WWE draft. Following the premiere of 205 Live, the cruiserweight wrestlers appear on both Raw and 205 Live, as well as making occasional appearances on NXT.

The show premiered on November 29, 2016; the main event of the inaugural episode saw Rich Swann defeating The Brian Kendrick for the WWE Cruiserweight Championship. The show would replace WWE Superstars, a show focused on the superstars of Raw, and Talking Smack, which previously held the post-Smackdown 10 p.m. ET time slot before moving to 11 p.m. after the debut of 205 Live.

In January 2018, Triple H took over the creative side of 205 Live. The first of the changes under Triple H was Drake Maverick as the brand on-screen general Manager. He announced a 16-man tournament for the vacant WWE Cruiserweight Championship, which was won by Cedric Alexander on the WrestleMania 34 kickoff. Once the tournament begun, WWE's cruiserweight division began to wrestle exclusively on 205 Live and ceased to appear on Raw.

In September 2018, due to the second season of WWE Mixed Match Challenge, 205 Live went from a live format airing post-SmackDown to a pre-taped format (being taped before SmackDown goes live) and airing before NXT on Wednesdays.

2019–2022

On January 15, 2019, the show moved back to Tuesday nights at 10:00 p.m. ET and began airing live again.

Just prior to WWE NXT moving to USA Network, NXT head Triple H spoke with Newsweek in September 2019 and said that "You'll start to see 205 [Live] begin to" become part of NXT. He said that 205 Live's talent would start moving towards NXT, that 205 Live had "become lost in [the] limbo", and that the Cruiserweight Championship would have more meaning on NXT where it could create more opportunities for the cruiserweight wrestlers. It was then reported that the NXT Creative Team would be in charge of 205 Live. The following month, the title began to be defended on NXT and was renamed to "NXT Cruiserweight Championship", becoming a part of the NXT brand.

Following SmackDowns move to Friday nights on October 4, 2019, 205 Live was also moved.

The integration of 205 Live with NXT took effect in-universe on October 18, 2019, following the 2019 WWE Draft, when Drake Maverick – who himself was drafted to SmackDown but remaining as the General Manager of 205 Live, announced that he had made a talent exchange agreement with NXT General Manager William Regal, whereby NXT cruiserweights could now appear on 205 Live. However, on April 12, 2020, Maverick announced that he was no longer 205 Live General Manager and that William Regal will instead be overseeing the Cruiserweight Division.

Due to both Raw and SmackDown recording shows in Manchester, England, the November 8, 2019 episode was recorded from the NXT "Full Sail Live" studio at Full Sail University.

On April 12, 2020, with the announcement that Drake Maverick would be competing in the Interim NXT Cruiserweight Championship tournament, Maverick confirmed via Twitter that he had stepped down as the 205 Live General Manager so that he could return to in-ring competition (though Maverick was released from WWE on April 15). NXT General Manager William Regal was announced to take over the managerial duties of 205 Live in addition to NXT.

Due to the COVID-19 pandemic in the United States, 205 Live moved to the WWE Performance Center indefinitely in March 2020, as with most other WWE programming. In August 2020, it briefly moved to Amway Center via WWE's "ThunderDome" residency, before moving back to the Performance Center to join NXT in its new "Capitol Wrestling Center" studio.

In 2021, first-round tournament matches for the Dusty Rhodes Tag Team Classic were held on 205 Live, as tag teams from the 205 Live brand also took part. A women's version of the tournament was also introduced in 2021, and as part of the inaugural Women's Dusty Rhodes Tag Team Classic, women's matches were held for the first time on 205 Live; the first match specifically saw The Way (Candice LeRae and Indi Hartwell) defeat the team of Cora Jade and Gigi Dolin on the January 22 episode.

By Summer 2021, as a result of significant roster cuts, the show's format would change to lift the restriction on weight limits starting with the August 13 episode. On February 15, 2022, PWInsider reported that WWE was ceasing the production of 205 Live episodes, replacing the series with NXT Level Up. 205 Live aired its final episode on February 11, with Level Up premiering on February 18.

Broadcast history

On-air personalities

Authority figures

Commentators

 When McGuinness was absent at the time, he was filled in by ''SmackDown Lives Byron Saxton.
 When McGuinness was absent for the birth of his daughter, he was filled in by his colleague from NXT Percy Watson for two weeks.
 When Joseph and McGuinness were absent for the UK Championship Tournament, so both men were replaced by SmackDown Live'''s Tom Phillips.
 When McGuinness was absent at the time, he was filled in by one of the pre-show panelists David Otunga.
 When Joseph has been traded recently for Main Event, SmackDown Lives Byron Saxton fills in for him as play-by-play.

Ring announcers

References

External links

 
2016 American television series debuts
2022 American television series endings
American sports television series
WWE Network shows
WWE Raw